Bali Pukhuria  is a village located in Ramnagar II Block  in the Purba Medinipur district in the state of West Bengal, India.

References 

Villages in Purba Medinipur district